The Fatal Hour is a 1940 American thriller crime drama film directed by William Nigh and starring Boris Karloff (as James Lee Wong), Grant Withers, and Marjorie Reynolds.

Fourth installation of the series, the film is also known as Mr. Wong at Headquarters in the United Kingdom. The picture was followed by the sequel Doomed to Die, which also stars Karloff, Reynolds and Withers.

Plot
The body of policeman Dan Grady is rescued in the San Francisco Bay lifeless and with clear indications of an execution. His good friend Captain Street, very touched by the tragedy, asks for the help of Mr. Wong and the journalist Bobbie Logan to solve the mystery. Dan was carrying out an investigation into gemstone smuggling, and the investigation leads to suspicion of jeweler Frank Belden's shop. A witness appears who saw Dan at 8.30 pm the night before at the Neptune club, a disreputable place run by Harry Lockett, a well-known cheater, con man and smuggler. The investigations will lead to the discovery of a ring of precious stone trafficking that revolved around the Neptune, in which both the owner and Frank Belden himself, and the vamp Tanya Serova were involved. Slowly, however, all the members of the gang end up killed, and the blame seems to fall on the young Frank Belden jr. son of the jeweler and boyfriend of Serova. It will be Wong himself who will discover the cunning ploy devised by the real culprit to frame the young man, so the head of the gang, the lawyer John T. Forbes, is arrested by Captain Street thanks to the decisive collaboration of Miss Logan.

Cast
 Boris Karloff as James Lee Wong
 Grant Withers as Capt. Bill Street
 Marjorie Reynolds as Roberta 'Bobbie' Logan
 Charles Trowbridge as John T. Forbes
 Frank Puglia as Harry 'Hardway' Lockett
 Craig Reynolds as Frank Belden, Jr.
 Lita Chevret as Tanya Serova
 Harry Strang as Det. Ballard
 Hooper Atchley as Frank Belden Sr.
 Jason Robards Sr. as Griswold (billed as Jason Robards)
 Richard Loo as Jeweler
 Jack Kennedy as Mike, Police Sergeant

References

External links

 
 
 
 
 

1940 films
American black-and-white films
Monogram Pictures films
American crime thriller films
American thriller drama films
American detective films
Films directed by William Nigh
American sequel films
American crime drama films
1940 crime drama films
Films set in San Francisco
1940s thriller drama films
1940s crime thriller films
1940s English-language films
1940s American films